School ghost stories may refer to:

Gakkō no Kaidan, a Japanese film series
School Ghost Stories, 1995
School Ghost Stories 2, 1996
"A School Story", a short story by M. R. James
School Spirit, a 1985 comedy film